Prostanthera parvifolia is a species of flowering plant in the family Lamiaceae and is endemic to  Queensland. It is an upright shrub with small, pale green leaves and mostly deep mauve flowers.

Description

Taxonomy and naming
Prostanthera parvifolia was first formally described in 1928 by Karel Domin and the description was published in Bibliotheca Botanica. The specific epithet (parvifolia) means "small leaves".

Distribution and habitat
This species is found growing in mallee scrub at Glenmorgan, Gurulmundi, Carnarvon Range, Pentland, Tara, Kogan and the Warrego Range.

References

parvifolia
Flora of Queensland
Lamiales of Australia
Plants described in 1928